Demoitis is a limited edition compilation by the American alternative rock band Chronic Future, containing demos recorded between 2001 and 2006. It was released in April 2009 through Modern Art Records. This release was limited to 500 copies. The album was purchasable via the band's Myspace page.

Track listing
 "Rocket Science"*** – 4:20
 "Ole"* – 4:00
 "Always and Forever"*** – 3:06
 "Songs About Us"* – 2:51
 "Make It Through Today"* – 3:45
 "Time and Time Again"** – 3:24
 "Shellshocked"** – 3:20
 "Thank You"** – 3:51
 "Whirlwind"* – 3:10
 "Eyes Wide Open"** – 3:03
 "Apology for Non-Symmetry"** – 2:51
 "World Keeps Spinning"** – 3:25
 "Wicked Games"** – 3:48
 "Can't Fight"* – 4:03
"**"  = Previously unreleased
"***"  = Studio version featured on Lines in My Face
"****"  = Studio version featured on Modern Art EP

Members
 Mike Busse – lead vocals, backing vocals
 Ben Collins – lead vocals, guitar, backing vocals
 Brandon Lee – lead vocals, bass guitar, backing vocals
 Barry Collins – drums, percussion

Chronic Future albums
2009 compilation albums